Langbank is a hamlet within the Rural Municipality of Silverwood No. 123 in the Canadian province of Saskatchewan.

History 
Langbank received a post office in 1910. It was named after Langbank in Renfrewshire, Scotland.

Demographics 

References

See also

Designated places in Saskatchewan
Hamlets in Saskatchewan
Silverwood No. 123, Saskatchewan